Hart Lake may refer to:

Cities, towns, townships etc.
Hart Lake Township in Hubbard County, Minnesota

Lakes
Hart Lake, a lake in Faribault County, Minnesota
Hart Lake (Hubbard County, Minnesota)
Hart Lake (Swift County, Minnesota)
Hart Lake (Oregon), a lake in Lake County, Oregon
Hart Lake (Cumberland), a lake in Cumberland County, Nova Scotia
Hart Lake (Guysborough), a lake in Guysborough District, Nova Scotia
Hart Lake, a lake in South Frontenac township, Frontenac County, Ontario